Girolamo Gastaldi (1616–1685) was a Roman Catholic cardinal.

Biography
On 12 May 1680, was consecrated bishop by Girolamo Boncompagni, Archbishop of Bologna, with Carlo Molza, Bishop of Modena, and Augusto Bellincini, Bishop of Reggio Emilia, serving as co-consecrators.

He is known for his treatise on the political and legal measures taken to control the plague, Tractatus de Avertenda et Profliganda Peste, Politico-Legalis, published in 1656.

References

External links and additional sources
 (for Chronology of Bishops) 
 (for Chronology of Bishops) 

1616 births
1685 deaths
17th-century Italian cardinals
17th-century Italian Roman Catholic archbishops
People from  the Province of Imperia